The Adjutant-General to the Forces, commonly just referred to as the Adjutant-General (AG), was for just over 250 years one of the most senior officers in the British Army. The AG was latterly responsible for developing the Army's personnel policies and supporting its people. The Adjutant-General usually held the rank of general or lieutenant general. Despite his administrative role, the Adjutant-General, like most officers above the rank of major general, was invariably drawn from one of the combat arms, not from the support corps.

History
In origin the Adjutant-General was chief staff officer to the Commander-in-Chief of the Forces. The post of Adjutant-General is first recorded in 1673 and it was established on a permanent basis in the English Army from 1680. For a time there were two Adjutants-General, one 'for the Foot' and one 'for the Horse' until the two were consolidated into a single appointment 'of the Forces' in 1701. Until the passing of the respective Acts of Union there were Scottish and Irish Adjutants-General; on occasions a separate Adjutant-General would be appointed for deployments overseas; and the Board of Ordnance had an independent Adjutant-General and Deputy for the Royal Artillery and Royal Engineers (respectively) until they were integrated into the British Army in the 1850s.

In the 18th century the Adjutant-General was tasked with issuing orders to the Army, receiving monthly returns from the Regiments, regulation of officers' appointments and leave of absence, and oversight of military reviews, exercises, manoeuvres and matters of discipline. By the early 1800s the Adjutant-General had responsibility for 'all subjects connected with the Discipline, Equipment and Efficiency of the Army'; the AG also took on general responsibility for recruitment at this time. A century later the AG is described as 'a general officer and at the head of his department of the War Office, which is charged with all duties relative to personnel'.

In the 20th century the Adjutant-General was the Second Military Member of the Army Council and its successor the Army Board. Headquarters Adjutant-General was latterly based at the former RAF Upavon, now known as Trenchard Lines, Upavon, Wiltshire. On 1 April 2008 it amalgamated with HQ Land Command to form HQ Land Forces under 'Project Hyperion'.

In December 2009 it was announced that the responsibilities of the Commander Regional Forces (i.e. responsibility for support) would be subsumed within those of the Adjutant-General to the Forces who henceforth would take responsibility for both personnel and support. In 2015 the post was re-designated Commander Personnel and Support Command (renamed Commander Home Command the following year). In evidence to the House of Commons Defence Committee the Chief of the General Staff explained:
"In my new operating model, I no longer have an Adjutant-General. The reason that I do not have an Adjutant-General is that effectively I am the Adjutant-General. People matter so much to me that I have put that at the heart of my agenda. I am the first CGS ever to have done that." (14 June 2016)

The appointment of a Deputy Adjutant-General is first recorded in 1757, with Assistant Adjutants-General being appointed from 1806.

List of Adjutants-General to the Forces 
Holders of the post include:
1743–1748 Colonel Charles Ingram
1763–1778 Lieutenant-General Edward Harvey
1778–1781 Lieutenant-General William Amherst
1781–1799 General Sir William Fawcett
1799–1820 Lieutenant-General Sir Harry Calvert
1820–1828 Major-General Sir Henry Torrens
1828–1830 Lieutenant-General Sir Herbert Taylor
1830–1850 Lieutenant-General Sir John Macdonald
1850–1853 General Sir George Brown
1853–1854 General Sir George Cathcart
1854–1860 General Sir George Weatherall
1860–1865 General Sir James Yorke Scarlett
1865–1870 General Lord William Paulet
1870–1876 General Sir Richard Airey
1876–1882 General Sir Charles Ellice
1882–1890 General Lord Wolseley
1882 Lieutenant-General Sir Richard Taylor
1890–1897 Lieutenant-General Sir Redvers Buller
1897–1901 Lieutenant-General Sir Evelyn Wood
1901–1904 Lieutenant-General Sir Thomas Kelly-Kenny
1904–1909 Lieutenant-General Sir Charles Douglas
1909–1910 Lieutenant-General Sir Ian Hamilton
1910–1914 Lieutenant-General Sir Spencer Ewart
1914–1916 Lieutenant-General Sir Henry Sclater
1916–1918 Lieutenant-General Sir Nevil Macready
1918–1922 Lieutenant-General Sir George Macdonogh
1922–1923 Lieutenant-General Sir Philip Chetwode
1923–1927 Lieutenant-General Sir Robert Whigham
1927–1931 General Sir Walter Braithwaite
1931–1933 General Sir Archibald Montgomery-Massingberd
1933–1935 General Sir Cecil Romer
1935–1937 General Sir Harry Knox
1937–1939 General Sir Clive Liddell
1939–1940 General Sir Robert Gordon-Finlayson
1940–1941 Lieutenant-General Colville Wemyss
1941–1946 General Sir Ronald Forbes Adam
1946–1947 General Sir Richard O'Connor
1947–1950 General Sir James Steele
1950–1953 General Sir John Crocker
1953–1956 General Sir Cameron Nicholson
1956–1959 General Sir Charles Loewen
1959–1960 General Sir Hugh Stockwell
1960–1963 General Sir Richard Goodbody
1963–1964 General Sir James Cassels
1964–1967 General Sir Reginald Hewetson
1967–1970 General Sir Geoffrey Musson
1970–1973 General Sir John Mogg
1973–1976 General Sir Cecil Blacker
1976–1978 General Sir Jack Harman
1978–1981 General Sir Robert Ford
1981–1984 General Sir George Cooper
1984–1986 General Sir Roland Guy
1986–1988 General Sir David Mostyn
1988–1990 General Sir Robert Pascoe
1990–1993 General Sir David Ramsbotham
1993–1995 General Sir Michael Wilkes
1995–1997 General Sir Michael Rose
1997–2000 General Sir Alexander Harley
2000–2003 Lieutenant-General Sir Timothy Granville-Chapman
2003–2005 Lieutenant-General Sir Alistair Irwin
2005–2008 Lieutenant-General Sir Freddie Viggers
2008–2009 Lieutenant-General Sir William Rollo
2009–2012 Lieutenant-General Sir Mark Mans
2012–2015 Lieutenant-General Sir Gerald Berragan

For subsequent equivalent appointments see Commander Home Command.

Deputy Adjutants-General to the Forces
1900 to 1902 Major-General Joseph Henry Laye
1902 to 1903 Major-General Arthur Wynne

See also 

 Adjutant general
 Adjutant General's Corps

References 

 Regiments website

Senior appointments of the British Army
War Office
War Office in World War II